Ignorance is a state of being uninformed.

Ignorance may also refer to: 

In social sciences:
Pluralistic ignorance, a concept in social psychology
Rational ignorance, a concept in epistemology
Vincible ignorance, a moral or doctrinal matter in Catholic ethics
 Ignorantia juris non excusat, literally "ignorance of the law is no excuse", the legal principle that the law applies also to those who are unaware of it
Avidyā (Hinduism), ignorance as a concept in Vedanta
Avijja, ignorance as a concept in Buddhism

In literature:
 Ignorance (novel), a 2000 novel by Milan Kundera
 Ignorance, a poem in Philip Larkin's collection The Whitsun Weddings

In music: 
Ignorance (album), a 1987 album by American metal band Sacred Reich
"Ignorance", a song by American pop punk band Paramore
Steve Ignorant, British punk musician

See also 
 Attention
 Ignoring (disambiguation)